Plaza de Toros de Vista Alegre (officially Vista Alegre zezen plaza) is a bullring in Bilbao, Spain. It is currently used for bull fighting. The stadium was built in 1882 and holds 14,781 people.

References

External links
 Official website 

Bullrings in Spain
Sports venues in the Basque Country (autonomous community)